Buck Hunt was an American football coach.  He was the first head football coach at Tennessee A&I State Normal School for Negroes—now known as Tennessee State University—in Nashville, Tennessee and he held that position for the 1916 season, compiling a record of 0–0–1.

References

Year of birth missing
Year of death missing
Tennessee State Tigers football coaches